Super Genius is a studio album released by the band Circus Lupus in 1992. The CD was re-released by Dischord Records in Washington DC in 2003. The album was described as "more strange and threatening", and a "ricocheting pinball of wailing vocals, snaking riffs that block and tackle". Team Rock noted it for having a "scuzzy, grungy undercurrent".

Track listing

Unrequited
Cyclone Billy
Pacifier
Breaking Point
Straight Through the Heart
Marbles
Mean Hot & Blessed
Cat Kicking Jerk
Blue Baby
Amish Blessing
Pulp
Tightrope Walker
Chinese Nitro

Personnel 
 Arika Casebolt (drums)
 Chris Hamley (guitars)
 Seth Lorinczi (bass)
 Chris Thomson (vocals)
 Eli Janney (producer)

References

External links
Dischord Records
Bandcamp listing

1992 albums
Circus Lupus albums